The hillstars are hummingbirds of the genus Oreotrochilus. They are native to the Andes in South America.

The Urochroa hillstars are not closely related.

Species list
Their genus contains seven species:
 Ecuadorian hillstar (Oreotrochilus chimborazo)
 Andean hillstar (Oreotrochilus estella)
 Green-headed hillstar (Oreotrochilus stolzmanni)
 White-sided hillstar (Oreotrochilus leucopleurus)
 Black-breasted hillstar (Oreotrochilus melanogaster)
 Wedge-tailed hillstar (Oreotrochilus adela)
Blue-throated hillstar (Oreotrochilus cyanolaemus)

Description
They are sexually dimorphic. The male usually has an iridescent green throat, or bluish-purple in the Ecuadorian hillstar, with dull greenish upperparts and pale flanks. The central underparts are usually black, but are brown in the Andean hillstar. The tail is usually dark with a contrasting white pattern; the pattern is cinnamon in the wedge-tailed hillstar, and the tail is entirely dark in the black-breasted hillstar. The female is duller, with a whitish throat densely spotted with green, white, buff, or cinnamon underparts, and a dark tail with a white pattern.

Behaviour
The Ecuadorian hillstar has been observed nesting at high altitudes on the cliffs of Cotopaxi. This species is known to nest colonially.

Many hillstars feed mainly on shrubs of the Andean plant genus Chuquiraga, and some species may be limited to them.

The genus has undergone allopatric speciation.

References

 Fjeldså, J. and I. Heynen (1999). Genus Oreotrochilus. pp. 623–24 In: del Hoyo, J., et al. (eds.) Handbook of the Birds of the World. Vol. 5. Barn-owls to Hummingbirds. Lynx Edicions, Barcelona. 1999. 

 
Taxa named by John Gould
Taxonomy articles created by Polbot